Beate Hasenau (1936–2003) was a German film and television actress. She also worked frequently as a voice actress.

Selected filmography
 Jack and Jenny (1963)
 Hot Pavements of Cologne (1967) 
 The Gorilla of Soho (1968)
 Everyone Dies Alone (1976)
 Three Swedes in Upper Bavaria (1977)

References

Bibliography 
 Peter Cowie & Derek Elley. World Filmography: 1967. Fairleigh Dickinson University Press, 1977.

External links 
 

1936 births
2003 deaths
Actors from Frankfurt
German film actresses
German television actresses